DJC may refer to:

 Daily Journal of Commerce, a newspaper published in Portland, Oregon, United States
 Dutch Jewish council, a council that was active during the German occupation of the Netherlands in World War II
 Missionary Church of the Disciples of Jesus Christ, a mendicant evangelical sect based in California's Inland Empire